Ellen G. White (November 26, 1827 – July 16, 1915), one of the founders of the Seventh-day Adventist Church, is identified as author of about 155 books, about 5,000 periodical articles, and 200 pamphlets.

Books
The books that identify White as author fall into two categories: (1) those published during her lifetime, i.e., until her death in 1915 and (2) those published after her death. The following information, listed by date of first publication, includes the title, the publication date, and the number of pages for each book (except for multi-volume works).

Books published 1847 – 1915 
White published the following books during her lifetime, including, in some cases, various editions of the same title. These approximately 50 volumes constitute about 32% of all the books that identify her as author.

 A Word to the “Little Flock” (1847). 30 pp.
 A Sketch of the Christian Experience and Views of Ellen G. White (1851). 64 pp.
 Supplement to the Christian Experience and Views of Ellen G. White (1854). 48 pp.
 Testimonies for the Church, 9 vols. (1855-1909)
 Spiritual Gifts, 4 vols. (1858, 1860, 1864).
 An Appeal to Mothers (1864). 63 pp.
 An Appeal to the Youth (1864. 95 pp.
 A Solemn Appeal (1870). 272 pp.
 The Spirit of Prophecy, 4 vols. (1870, 1877, 1878, 1884)
 Life Sketches of James and Ellen White (1880). 416 pp.
 Early Writings of Ellen G. White (1882). 324 pp.
 Sketches From the Life of Paul (1883). 334 pp.
 Historical Sketches of the Foreign Missions of the Seventh-day Adventists (1886). 294 pp.
 The Great Controversy Between Christ and Satan (1888). 722 pp.
 Life Sketches of James and Ellen White (1888). 453 pp.
 The Sanctified Life (1889). 110 pp.
 Christian Temperance and Bible Hygiene (1890). 268 pp.
 Patriarchs and Prophets (1890). 805 pp.
 Gospel Workers (1892). 480 pp.
 Steps to Christ (1892). 134 pp.
 Christian Education (1893). 255 pp.
 Thoughts From the Mount of Blessing (1896). 172 pp.
 Story of Jesus (1896). 190 pp.
 Healthful Living (1897). 336 pp.
 Special Testimonies on Education (c. 1897). 240 pp.
 The Desire of Ages (1898). 863 pp.
 The Southern Work (1898, 1901). 96 pp.
 Christ's Object Lessons (1900). 436 pp.
 Testimonies on Sabbath-School Work (1900). 128 pp.
 Manual for Canvassers (1902). 78 pp.
 Education (1903). 324 pp.
 The Ministry of Healing (1905). 540 pp.
 The Acts of the Apostles (1911). 633 pp.
 The Great Controversy Between Christ and Satan (1911). 719 pp.
 Counsels to Parents, Teachers, and Students (1913). 575 pp.
 Gospel Workers (1915). 534 pp.
 Life Sketches of Ellen G. White (1915). 480 pp.

Books Published Posthumously after 1915 
The Ellen G. White Estate published or authorized the publication of the following books after White's death. These approximately 105 volumes constitute about 68% of all the books that identify her as author. They include compilations of White's writings on various topics and selections for use as daily devotionals, as well as retitled volumes and those that abbreviate or modernize her original publications. Other than the first item below, White was not involved in the preparation or publication of any of these books.

 Prophets and Kings (1917). 752 pp.
 Colporteur Evangelist. (1920). 112 pp.
 Christian Experience and Teachings of Ellen G. White (1922). 268 pp.
 Counsels on Health (1923). 687 pp.
 Fundamentals of Christian Education (1923). 576 pp.
 Testimonies to Ministers and Gospel Workers (1923). 566 pp.
 Christian Service (1925). 283 pp.
 Testimony Studies on Diet and Foods (1926). 199 pp.
 Messages to Young People (1930). 498 pp.
 Medical Ministry (1932). 355 pp.
 A Call to Medical Evangelism and Health Education (1933). 47 pp.
 Counsels on Diet and Foods (1938). 511 pp.
 Counsels on Sabbath School Work (1938). 192 pp.
 Counsels on Stewardship (1940). 372 pp.
 Counsels to Writers and Editors (1946). 192 pp.
 Country Living (1946). 32 pp.
 Evangelism (1946). 747 pp.
 Radiant Religion (1946). 271 pp.
 The Story of Redemption (1947). 445 pp.
 Temperance (1949). 309 pp.
 With God at Dawn (1949). 367 pp.
 The Adventist Home (1952). 583 pp.
 My Life Today (1952). 377 pp.
 Welfare Ministry (1952). 349 pp.
 Colporteur Ministry (1953). 176 pp.
 The Seventh-day Adventist Bible Commentary: Ellen G. White Comments, 7 vols, plus supplement vol.  7A (1953-1957).
 Child Guidance (1954). 616 pp.
 Sons and Daughters of God (1955). 383 pp.
 Counsels for the Church (1957). 462 pp.
 Help in Daily Living (1957). 64 pp.
 The Faith I Live By (1958). 426 pp.
 Selected Messages, 3 books (1958, 1980).
 Our High Calling (1961). 380 pp.
 That I May Know Him (1964). 382 pp.
 In Heavenly Places (1967). 382 pp.
 Conflict and Courage (1970). 381 pp.
 Confrontation (1970). 93 pp.
 The Health Food Ministry (1970). 95 pp
 A New Life (1972). 64 pp.
 God's Amazing Grace (1973). 383 pp.
 Christian Leadership (1974). 77 pp.
 Maranatha; The Lord Is Coming (1976). 383 pp.
 Mind, Character, and Personality, 2 vols. (1977). 882 pp.
 Testimonies to Southern Africa (1977). 98 pp.
 Faith and Works (1979). 122 pp.
 This Day With God (1979). 384 pp.
 Peter's Counsel to Parents (1981). 63 pp. 
 Manuscript Releases, 4 vols. (1981, 1987, 1990, 1993).
 The Upward Look (1982). 383 pp.
 Letters to Young Lovers (1983). 94 pp.
 The Publishing Ministry (1983). 430 pp.
 Reflecting Christ (1985). 382 pp.
 1888 Materials (1987). 382 pp.
 Lift Him Up (1988). 382 pp. 
 The Voice in Speech and Song (1988). 480 pp.
 Testimonies on Sexual Behavior, Adultery, and Divorce (1989). 270 pp.
 The Retirement Years (1990). 24 pp.
 Sermons and Talks, 2 vols. (1990, 1994).
 Our Father Cares (1991). 350 pp.
 Last Day Events (1992). 330 pp.
 Pastoral Ministry (1995). 287 pp.
 Ye Shall Receive Power (1995). 382 pp.
 The Truth About Angels (1996). 314 pp.
 Darkness Before Dawn (1997). 64 pp.
 Daughters of God (1998). 275 pp.
 Christ Triumphant (1999). 384 pp.
 A Call to Stand Apart (2002). 120 pp.
 Prayer (2002). 320 pp.
 Heaven (2003). 192 pp.
 To Be Like Jesus (2004). 383 pp.
 Living in the Sunlight (2004). 80 pp.
 Pastoral Ministry (2004). 288 pp.
 The Ministry of Health and Healing (2005). 304 pp.
 Beginning of the End (2006). 384 pp.
 Story of Hope (2006). 128 pp.
 Praise God in Song (2007). 64 pp.
 Royalty and Ruin (2007). 256 pp.
 Counsels on Speech and Song (2007). 496 pp.
 Humble Hero (2008). 192 pp.
 Happiness for Life (2008). 64 pp.
 Christ in His Sanctuary (2009). 192 pp.
 From the Heart (2010). 377 pp.
 True Revival (2010). 96 pp.
 Unlikely Leaders (2010). 224 pp.
 Love Under Fire (2011). 288 pp.
 Ministry to the Cities (2012). 224 pp.
 Real Peace, Real Answers (2013). 192 pp.
 Ellen G. White Letters and Manuscripts with Annotation, vol. 1 (2014). 1024 pp.
 Homeward Bound (2015). 400 pp.
 God Has a Home for You (2016). 64 pp.
 God is Listening (2016). 64 pp.
 Principles for Christian Leaders (2018). 322 pp.

References

External links

 Ellen G. White Estate

Bibliographies by writer
 
Bibliographies of American writers
Christian bibliographies